State Route 179 (SR 179) is a  long north–south state highway in the central portion of the U.S. state of Ohio.

Route description
SR 179 traverses the northwestern portion of Holmes County and the southeastern quadrant of Ashland County.  No part of this state highway is included within the National Highway System (NHS).  The NHS is a system of routes that are identified as being most important for the economy, mobility and defense of the country.

History
SR 179 was assigned in 1923.  This highway has maintained the same routing between SR 39 near Nashville and SR 60 in Hayesville for its entire lifetime.

Major intersections

References

179
179
179